Lohagara Upazila may refer to:

Lohagara Upazila, Chittagong

Hafez Para is a village in PUTİBİLA union in Lohagara Upazila, CHİTTAGONG